Antonio Demarcus Wilson (born December 29, 1977) is a former American football linebacker who played in the National Football League from 2000 to 2002. He was drafted by the Minnesota Vikings in the fourth round of the 2000 NFL Draft. He played college football for the Texas A&M-Commerce Lions.

References

1977 births
Living people
American football linebackers
Barcelona Dragons players
Edmonton Elks players
Minnesota Vikings players
People from Dallas County, Texas
Players of American football from Texas
Texas A&M–Commerce Lions football players